Deon Eugene Lotter  (born 10 November 1957) is a former South African rugby union player.

Playing career
Lotter first started playing rugby in his final year at school. After school and his national service, he enrolled at the Stellenbosch University for a degree in engineering. He made his debut for Western Province against Boland in a friendly match in 1981, replacing an injured Morne du Plessis. During his years with Western Province, he competed with players such as Theuns Stofberg, Kulu Ferreira and Gert Smal for a place in the first team. After obtaining his degree he spent two year at Griqualand West, after which he returned to Western Province. In 1989 Lotter moved to the Transvaal. He was part of the Transvaal team that won the Currie Cup in 1993.

Lotter made his test debut for South Africa during the 1993 French tour of South Africa, in second test on 3 July 1993 at Ellis Park in Johannesburg. In 1993 Lotter toured with the Springboks to Australia, playing in two of the three tests. Lotter played in three tests matches and four tour matches, scoring one try for the Springboks.

Test history

See also
List of South Africa national rugby union players – Springbok no. 588

References

1957 births
Living people
South African rugby union players
South Africa international rugby union players
Western Province (rugby union) players
Griquas (rugby union) players
Golden Lions players
People from Stellenbosch
Rugby union players from the Western Cape
Rugby union locks